Carposina cinderella is a moth in the family Carposinidae. It is found on the Canary Islands.

The wingspan is about 16.5 mm. The forewings are whitish ochreous, densely dusted with dark grey. The hindwings are light grey, suffused with dark grey from the middle to the costa.

References

Carposinidae
Moths described in 1989